The Rubens is the debut studio album by Australian alternative rock group, The Rubens. The album was released on 14 September 2012 and reached number 3 on the Australian Albums Chart.

A deluxe edition was released on 26 April 2013, featuring 8 additional tracks, 7 of which are live tracks recorded live at The Forum in Melbourne on 15 September 2012.

At the J Awards of 2012, the album was nominated for Australian Album of the Year.

The album was nominated for ARIA Award for Breakthrough Artist – Release and ARIA Award for Best Rock Album at the ARIA Music Awards of 2013.

Reception
Matt Collar of AllMusic gave the album 4 out of 5, saying; "Australian rock outfit the Rubens' 2012 self-titled debut showcases the band's dark, melodic soulful pop. The album finds the band splitting the difference between a Baroque, piano-driven '60s pop approach and a contemporary, bass-heavy garage rock sound. Think Britain's Ed Harcourt meets the Black Keys."

Track listing

Charts

Weekly charts

Year-end charts

Certifications

Release history

References

2012 debut albums
The Rubens albums
Ivy League Records albums
Albums produced by David Kahne